Antiperovskites (or inverse perovskites) is a type of crystal structure similar to the perovskite structure that is common in nature.  The key difference is that the positions of the cation and anion constituents are reversed in the unit cell structure.  In contrast to perovskite, antiperovskite compounds consist of two types of anions coordinated with one type of cation. Antiperovskite compounds are an important class of materials because they exhibit interesting and useful physical properties not found in perovskite materials, including as electrolytes in solid-state batteries.

Structure

The crystal lattice of an antiperovskite structure is the same as that of the perovskite structure, but the anion and cation positions are switched. The typical perovskite structure is represented by the general formula ABX3, where A and B are cations and X is an anion. When the anion is the (divalent) oxide ion, A and B cations can have charges 1 and 5, respectively, 2 and 4, respectively, or 3 and 3, respectively.

In antiperovskite compounds, the general formula is reversed, so that the X sites are occupied by an electropositive ion, i.e., cation (such as an alkali metal), while A and B sites are occupied by different types of anion. In the ideal cubic cell, the A anion is at the corners of the cube, the B anion at the octahedral center, and the X cation is at the faces of the cube. Thus the A anion has a coordination number of 12, while the B anion sits at the center of an octahedron with a coordination number of 6.

Similar to the perovskite structure, most antiperovskite compounds are known to deviate from the ideal cubic structure, forming orthorhombic or tetragonal phases depending on temperature and pressure.

Whether a compound will form an antiperovskite structure depends not only on its chemical formula, but also the relative sizes of the ionic radii of the constituent atoms. This constraint is expressed in terms of the Goldschmidt tolerance factor, which is determined by the radii, ra, rb and rx, of the A, B, and X ions.

Tolerance factor = 

For the antiperovskite structure to be structurally stable, the tolerance factor must be between 0.71 and 1.  If between 0.71 and 0.9, the crystal will be orthorhombic or tetragonal.  If between 0.9 and 1, it will be cubic. By mixing the B anions with another element of the same valence but different size, the tolerance factor can be altered.  Different combinations of elements result in different compounds with different regions of thermodynamic stability for a given crystal symmetry.

Occurrence
Antiperovskites naturally occur in sulphohalite, galeite, schairerite, kogarkoite, nacaphite, arctite, polyphite, and hatrurite. It is also demonstrated in superconductive compounds such as CuNNi3 and ZnNNi3.

Material properties

Synthesized Antiperovskites

Man-made antiperovskites exhibit interesting properties. The physical properties of antiperovskite compounds can be manipulated by altering the stoichiometry, element substitution, and synthesis conditions.

Lithium Rich Antiperovskites (LiRAP)

Recently synthesized antiperovskites with chemical formula Li3OBr and Li3OCl have demonstrated high lithium-ion conductivity.  Known as LiRAPs, these are being investigated for use as electrolytes in solid-state batteries and fuel cells. In addition, other alkali-rich antiperovskites such as Na3OCl are also being investigated for their superionic conductivity.

Metallic Antiperovskite

Discovered in 1930, these crystals have the formula M3AB where M represents a magnetic element, Mn, Ni, or Fe; A represents a transition or main group element, Ga, Cu, Sn, and Zn;  and B represents N, C, or B.  These materials exhibit superconductivity, giant magnetoresistance, and other unusual properties.

Antiperovskite manganese nitrides

Antiperovskite manganese nitrides have been shown to exhibit zero thermal expansion.

References

 Superionic Conductivity in Lithium-Rich Anti-Perovskites
 Lattice and Magnetic and Electronic Transport Properties in Antiperovskite Compounds
 A material for all weathers (with zero thermal expansion) found in antiperovskite manganese nitrides

Mineralogy
Materials science